Over the course of his career, Portuguese footballer Cristiano Ronaldo has received five Ballon d'Or/FIFA Ballon d'Or awards, the most for a European player. Widely regarded as one of the greatest players of all time, Ronaldo holds the record for most goals and assists in the UEFA Champions League (140 and 42 respectively), and the record for most goals in the UEFA European Championship (14), its qualification stage (31), and the FIFA Club World Cup (7), as well as most goals scored in a UEFA Champions League season (17), most international goals (118), and most appearances in a European national team (196). He has scored a record 824 senior career goals for club and country. Moreover, he is one of the few recorded players to have made over 1,100 professional career appearances.

Collectively, Ronaldo has won 32 senior trophies in his career. He has also attained one title from youth and at least five titles from friendly competitions. All in all he had won over 300 trophies and medals by January 2021, with some of them dating back to his childhood.

Collective awards

Friendly competitions

Individual honours 
Ronaldo has obtained many other minor achievements, awards and recognitions, by the major sport magazines and newspapers, which are not reported.

Selections for the best player or forward

Goalscoring

Top goalscorer 
Overall, Ronaldo has achieved 46 top goalscorer accolades.

Goal of the competition 
Ronaldo has won many goal of the competition accolades, and was named runner-up for three nominations.

Top assist provider

Inclusions in theoretical teams

Selections for international sportsperson of the year

International man of the match awards

Orders 

  Medal of Merit, Order of the Immaculate Conception of Vila Viçosa (Portuguese Royal Family)
  Grand officer of the Order of Prince Henry
  Commander of the Order of Merit
  Officer of the Order of Prince Henry
 Cordão Autonómico de Distinção

Miscellaneous

Records

Goalscoring statistics

Club

Country

List of senior career goals 
Scores and results list Cristiano Ronaldo's team's goal tally first.

Detailed statistics

Gallery

See also 
 Museu CR7 – a museum that is dedicated to Cristiano Ronaldo's trophies

Footnotes

References

Works cited
Biographies
 
 

Ronaldo, Cristiano
Career achievements